Zehnhausen bei Wallmerod is an Ortsgemeinde – a community part of a Verbandsgemeinde – in the Westerwaldkreis in Rhineland-Palatinate, Germany. It is one of two communities named Zehnhausen in the Westerwaldkreis, the other being Zehnhausen bei Rennerod.

Geography

The community lies in the Westerwald between Montabaur and Limburg an der Lahn. It belongs to the Verbandsgemeinde of Wallmerod, a kind of collective municipality. Its seat is in the like-named town.

History
In 1391, Zehnhausen bei Wallmerod had its first documentary mention as Zeenhußen.

Politics

The municipal council is made up of 6 council members who were elected in a majority vote in a municipal election on 13 June 2004.

Regular events
The Linden Blossom Festival (Lindenblütenfest) held every year on the first weekend in July has grown into an attraction for the whole local area.

Economy and infrastructure

To Bundesstraße 8, linking Limburg an der Lahn and Hennef, it is four kilometres. The nearest Autobahn interchange is Diez on the A 3 (Cologne–Frankfurt), some eleven kilometres away. The nearest InterCityExpress stop is the railway station at Montabaur on the Cologne-Frankfurt high-speed rail line.

References

External links
 Ortsportrait Zehnhausen bei Wallmerod 

Westerwaldkreis